Pat Baker may refer to:

 Pat Baker (soccer) (born 1962), American soccer goalkeeper
 Pat Baker (lacrosse) (born 1939), Canadian box lacrosse goaltender